Tom Homburg (born 4 January 1988 in Nijmegen)  is a Bonaire footballer who currently plays for S.V. Uruguay of the Bonaire League and the Bonaire national football team.

Career

Club
As a youth, Homburg played for SV Orion in his hometown of Nijmegen, Netherlands. He, along with three other players from the junior teams, made his debut for the first team of the club in 2007 in a 3–0 victory against SC Veluwezoom. He remained with the club until at least 2012 when he appeared in a match against FC Presikhaaf on the 5 March and against SC Varsseveld on 11 March. While with Orion, Homburg played as a striker.

Since 2014, he has played for S.V. Uruguay of the Bonaire League.

International
Homburg made his debut for Bonaire on 3 September 2014 in a 2014 Caribbean Cup qualification match against Martinique.

International career statistics

Honours
Kopa MCB
Runners-up (2): 2014, 2015/16
Source(s):

Personal
Homburg attended the HAN University of Applied Sciences. Since 2013, he has been a sport coordinator on Bonaire.

References

External links
 Caribbean Football Database profile
 

Living people
Association football midfielders
Bonaire international footballers
1988 births
Bonaire footballers
Footballers from Nijmegen
Dutch expatriate footballers
Dutch footballers
SV Orion players